Passiflora xiikzodz, the xiikzodz, is a species of flowering plant in the passion flower/passion fruit family Passifloraceae, native to southeastern Mexico, Belize, and Guatemala. The specific epithet is derived from the Mayan vernacular name for the species, and means "bat-wing". It is closely related to Passiflora itzensis but attempts to cross-pollinate the two species do not result in any offspring.

References

xiikzodz
Flora of Southeastern Mexico
Flora of Belize
Flora of Guatemala
Plants described in 1992